Oleszno  is a village in the administrative district of Gmina Drawsko Pomorskie, within Drawsko County, West Pomeranian Voivodeship, in north-western Poland.

The village has a population of 670.

See also 
 History of Pomerania

References 

Oleszno